Dyerophytum is a small genus of three species of plants distributed in India, southern Arabia, Socotra and southern Africa.

Species
Dyerophytum africanum
Dyerophytum pendulum
Dyerophytum socotranum

References

Plumbaginaceae
Caryophyllales genera